Bengt Jönsson may refer to:

 Bengt Jönsson (athletics coach) (born 1958), Swedish trainer in athletics
 Bengt Jönsson (Oxenstierna), Swedish statesman and co-regent of Sweden
 Bengt Jönsson (swimmer) (born 1955), Swedish swimmer